The catfish effect is the effect that a strong competitor has in causing the weak to better themselves. Actions done to actively apply this effect (for example, by the human resource department) in an organization, are termed catfish management.

In Norway, live sardines are several times more expensive than frozen ones, and are valued for better texture and flavor. It was said that only one ship could bring live sardines home, and the shipmaster kept his method a secret. After he died, people found that there was one catfish in the tank. The catfish keeps swimming, and the sardines try to avoid this predator. This increased level of activity keeps the sardines active instead of becoming sedentary, according to Vince from the Catfish film.

In human resource management, this is a method used to motivate a team so that each member feels strong competition, thus keeping up the competitiveness of the whole team.

Origin of the effect 
The exact origin is unknown. There are very few discussions of this effect in the English literature, but it is widely cited and discussed in the Chinese literature such as library research.

See also
Catfishing

References

Organizational theory